Isabella Eddey (born 11 February 2002) is an Australian rules footballer playing for  in the AFL Women's. She grew up in Melbourne’s bayside suburbs and attended Haileybury College.

Junior career 
As a junior, Eddey played as an outside midfielder for the Sandringham Dragons in the NAB League Girls and also represented her region, Vic Metro, at the AFLW Under 18 Championships. In 2020, she played three matches in the NAB League, amassing an average of 17.7 disposals, and earning an invitation to the Victorian AFLW draft combine. However, restrictions imposed due to the COVID-19 pandemic would ultimately force the rest of the NAB League season and the Victorian combine to be cancelled.

Despite these interruptions, several commentators considered Eddey an elite prospect, likely to be selected early in the 2020 AFLW draft. Kevin Sheehan ranked Eddey among his top 30 potential draftees, noting her "silky skills", goal sense, composure, and footwork in contested situations. Sarah Black, a womens.afl journalist, concurred with Sheehan's praise and also highlighted Eddey's targeted passes and strong running ability. She predicted Eddey would be selected around pick 16 in the 2020 draft.

AFLW career 
She made her debut in the opening round of the 2021 season against , kicking her first goal by capitalising on a loose ball in the goalsquare. It was revealed she signed on with the club for two more seasons on 17 June 2021, tying her to the club until the end of 2023.

References

External links 

Living people
2002 births
Australian rules footballers from Victoria (Australia)
Sandringham Dragons players
North Melbourne Football Club (AFLW) players